Over Her Dead Body is a 2008 American romantic comedy film starring Eva Longoria, Paul Rudd, Lake Bell, Lindsay Sloane and Jason Biggs. It was written and directed by Jeff Lowell. The film is about Kate (Eva Longoria), who  dies on the day of her wedding to fiancé Henry (Paul Rudd). He subsequently begins a relationship with psychic Ashley (Lake Bell) who becomes haunted by Kate trying to sabotage their relationship.

The film was released in the United States and Canada on February 1, 2008.

Plot
Kate and Henry are a happy couple. Henry proposed to Kate and they are about to be married, but on the day of their wedding, Kate is accidentally killed by an ice sculpture angel, because of the actions of an ice sculptor. Unaware that she has died and her soul left her body, Kate awakens in Purgatory, and wastes precious time arguing with an angel who finally leaves before she can explain to Kate what she must do to move on.

A year later, Henry's sister Chloe hopes that he will find closure by consulting beautiful Ashley, a psychic who also runs a catering business with her gay best friend Dan. After an unsuccessful first meeting, Chloe gives Kate's diary to Ashley so that she can pretend to communicate with Kate and convince Henry to move on with his life. In the process, Henry and Ashley fell in love with each other... much to the consternation of Kate, who has been watching over Henry. When Kate voices her displeasure, Ashley hears her, unaware of what it means.

Angry over Ashley's deception and uncertain of what she is supposed to do, Kate later encounters the ice sculptor, and discovers that he is also a ghost (a result of a drunk driving accident). He explains to her that they must deal with their unfinished business. Believing that her job is to protect Henry, Kate proceeds to harass Ashley (who is the only one who can see or hear Kate). Using her ghostly abilities of intangibility, levitation, and auditory hallucination, Kate hopes to force Ashley to break up with Henry. Ashley persists, but then Henry discovers the fraud with the diary and breaks off the relationship. Despondent over the break-up, Ashley turns to Dan for solace, but is further distraught when Dan reveals that he is not gay and has secretly been in love with her for years. Over time, Ashley and Dan eventually reconcile.

After several months of watching Henry fall back into a depressed funk, Kate encounters the sculptor once more, who points out that if she had resolved her unfinished business, she would have moved on to Heaven by now. When the sculptor asks her what she really wants, Kate reluctantly admits that she only wants Henry to be happy... and realizes that he could be happy with Ashley. Then the sculptor reveals that Kate was his unfinished business and he had to get her to do the right thing before moving on, which he does. Kate first attempts to convince Ashley to get back together with Henry but Ashley doesn't believe her change of heart, and is preparing to fly to Las Vegas with Dan. In desperation, Kate finds she is able to talk to Henry through his pet parrot and gets him to meet Ashley at the airport. Realizing that Henry has forgiven her and that she has Kate's blessing, Ashley joyfully embraces with Henry. At their wedding, Ashley delays her walk down the aisle to sit briefly in the back pew, to promise Kate that she will strive to make Henry happy. Also at the wedding, Dan makes a new connection with Chloe. Now ready to move on, Kate arrives once more in Purgatory, congratulated for her efforts by the angel and requests the "orb of true light" collected from Kate's loved ones. The angel leaves once again, leaving Kate in Purgatory.

Cast

Reception

Critical response
On Rotten Tomatoes, the film has an approval rating of 15% based on 108 reviews and an average rating of 3.7/10. The site's critical consensus reads, "With few laughs and little romantic chemistry, Over Her Dead Body lacks the ingredients of a successful romantic comedy." On Metacritic, the film has a score of 30 out of 100 based on 29 critics, indicating "generally unfavorable reviews". Audiences polled by CinemaScore gave the film an average grade of "C+" on an A+ to F scale.

The film received an overall "C" grade from critics on Yahoo! Movies. Matt Pais of the Chicago Tribune called it "The kind of movie that wouldn't even hold your attention mid-flight." A. O. Scott of The New York Times said "...could be much worse. But it also could have been, with a little more effort, a lot better."

James Berardinelli of ReelViews called it "as mediocre a motion picture as you're likely to find in a multiplex this season." Sean Axmaker of the Seattle Post-Intelligencer said "...it's as flat as day-old soda, a comedy completely lacking in bubbles or fizz." Radio Times gave the film one star out of five: "There's nothing worse than a bungled comedy, but this just might be it."

Box office
The film opened in eleventh place at the box office with US$4 million in its opening weekend. As of October 5, 2008, the film had grossed a total of $21,458,111 worldwide.

Home media

The movie was released to DVD on May 6, 2008.

See also
 List of ghost films
 Kiss Me Goodbye

References

External links
 
 
 
 
 

2008 films
2000s fantasy comedy films
2000s ghost films
2008 romantic comedy films
2000s romantic fantasy films
American fantasy comedy films
American ghost films
American romantic comedy films
American romantic fantasy films
Films scored by David Kitay
Gold Circle Films films
Fiction about purgatory
2008 directorial debut films
2000s English-language films
2000s American films